Aleksandr Appolonovich Alenitsyn (29 November 1884 – 5 October 1922) was a Russian tennis player. He competed in the men's outdoor doubles event at the 1912 Summer Olympics. He committed suicide in prison in 1922 after being arrested and tortured by Soviet authorities for "having contacts with other countries".

References

External links
 

1884 births
1922 suicides
Russian male tennis players
Olympic tennis players of Russia
Tennis players at the 1912 Summer Olympics
Tennis players from Moscow
Russian people who died in prison custody
Prisoners who died in Soviet detention
Suicides in Moscow
People who committed suicide in prison custody
Russian torture victims
 Suicides in the Soviet Union
1922 deaths